The taxon author Stehmann may refer to:
 João Renato Stehmann (Stehmann), a botanist
 Matthias Stehmann, an ichthyologist